Sputnik 1 (see § Etymology) was the first artificial Earth satellite. It was launched into an elliptical low Earth orbit by the Soviet Union on 4 October 1957 as part of the Soviet space program. It sent a radio signal back to Earth for three weeks before its three silver-zinc batteries ran out. Aerodynamic drag caused it to fall back into the atmosphere on 4 January 1958.

It was a polished metal sphere  in diameter with four external radio antennas to broadcast radio pulses. Its radio signal was easily detectable by amateur radio operators, and the 65° orbital inclination made its flight path cover virtually the entire inhabited Earth.

The satellite's unanticipated success precipitated the American Sputnik crisis and triggered the Space Race, part of the Cold War. The launch was the beginning of a new era of political, military, technological and scientific developments. The word sputnik is Russian for satellite when interpreted in an astronomical context; its other meanings are spouse or traveling companion.

Tracking and studying Sputnik 1 from Earth provided scientists with valuable information. The density of the upper atmosphere could be deduced from its drag on the orbit, and the propagation of its radio signals gave data about the ionosphere.

Sputnik 1 was launched during the International Geophysical Year from Site No.1/5, at the 5th Tyuratam range, in Kazakh SSR (now known as the Baikonur Cosmodrome). It transmitted on 20.005 and 40.002 MHz, which were monitored by radio operators throughout the world. The signals continued for 21 days until the transmitter batteries ran out on 26 October 1957.

Etymology
In the Russian language, sputnik is the general term for the artificial satellites of any country and the natural satellites of any planet.

Before the launch

Satellite construction project 
On 17 December 1954, chief Soviet rocket scientist Sergei Korolev proposed a developmental plan for an artificial satellite to the Minister of the Defense Industry, Dimitri Ustinov. Korolev forwarded a report by Mikhail Tikhonravov, with an overview of similar projects abroad. Tikhonravov had emphasized that the launch of an orbital satellite was an inevitable stage in the development of rocket technology.

On 29 July 1955, U.S. President Dwight D. Eisenhower announced through his press secretary that, during the International Geophysical Year (IGY), the United States would launch an artificial satellite. Four days later, Leonid Sedov, a leading Soviet physicist, announced that they too would launch an artificial satellite. On 8 August, the Politburo of the Communist Party of the Soviet Union approved the proposal to create an artificial satellite. On 30 August Vasily Ryabikov—the head of the State Commission on the R-7 rocket test launches—held a meeting where Korolev presented calculation data for a spaceflight trajectory to the Moon. They decided to develop a three-stage version of the R-7 rocket for satellite launches.

On 30 January 1956 the Council of Ministers approved practical work on an artificial Earth-orbiting satellite. The first test launch of "Object D" was scheduled for 1957. Work on the satellite was to be divided among institutions as follows:

 The USSR Academy of Sciences was responsible for the general scientific leadership and the supply of research instruments
 The Ministry of the Defense Industry and its primary design bureau, OKB-1, were assigned the task of building the satellite
 The Ministry of the Radio technical Industry would develop the control system, radio/technical instruments, and the telemetry system
 The Ministry of the Ship Building Industry would develop gyroscope devices
 The Ministry of the Machine Building would develop ground launching, refueling and transportation means
 The Ministry of the Defense was responsible for conducting launches

Preliminary design work was completed in July 1956 and the scientific tasks to be carried out by the satellite were defined. These included measuring the density of the atmosphere and its ion composition, the solar wind, magnetic fields, and cosmic rays. This data would be valuable in the creation of future artificial satellites; a system of ground stations was to be developed to collect data transmitted by the satellite, observe the satellite's orbit, and transmit commands to the satellite. Because of the limited time frame, observations were planned for only 7 to 10 days and orbit calculations were not expected to be extremely accurate.

By the end of 1956 it became clear that the complexity of the ambitious design meant that 'Object D' could not be launched in time because of difficulties creating scientific instruments and the low specific impulse produced by the completed R-7 engines (304 sec instead of the planned 309 to 310 sec). Consequently, the government rescheduled the launch for April 1958. Object D would later fly as Sputnik 3.

Fearing the U.S. would launch a satellite before the USSR, OKB-1 suggested the creation and launch of a satellite in April–May 1957, before the IGY began in July 1957. The new satellite would be simple, light, and easy to construct, forgoing the complex, heavy scientific equipment in favour of a simple radio transmitter. On 15 February 1957 the Council of Ministers of the USSR approved this simple satellite, designated 'Object PS'. This version allowed the satellite to be tracked visually by Earth-based observers, and it could transmit tracking signals to ground-based receiving stations. The launch of two satellites, PS-1 and PS-2, with two R-7 rockets (8K71), was approved, provided that the R-7 completed at least two successful test flights.

Launch vehicle preparation and launch site selection 

The R-7 rocket was initially designed as an intercontinental ballistic missile (ICBM) by OKB-1. The decision to build it was made by the Central Committee of the Communist Party of the Soviet Union and the Council of Ministers of the USSR on 20 May 1954. The rocket was the most powerful in the world; it was designed with excess thrust since they were unsure how heavy the hydrogen bomb payload would be. The R-7 was also known by its GRAU (later GURVO, the Russian abbreviation for "Chief Directorate of the Rocket Forces") designation 8K71. At the time, the R-7 was known to NATO sources as the T-3 or M-104, and Type A. A special reconnaissance commission selected Tyuratam for the construction of a rocket proving ground, the 5th Tyuratam range, usually referred to as "NIIP-5", or "GIK-5" in the post-Soviet time. The selection was approved on 12 February 1955 by the Council of Ministers of the USSR, but the site would not be completed until 1958. Actual work on the construction of the site began on 20 July by military building units. On 14 June 1956, Korolev decided to adapt the R-7 rocket to the 'Object D' (Sputnik 3), that would later be replaced by the much lighter 'Object PS' (Sputnik 1).

The first launch of an R-7 rocket (8K71 No.5L) occurred on 15 May 1957. A fire began in the Blok D strap-on almost immediately at liftoff, but the booster continued flying until 98 seconds after launch when the strap-on broke away and the vehicle crashed some  downrange. Three attempts to launch the second rocket (8K71 No.6) were made on 10–11 June, but an assembly defect prevented launch. The unsuccessful launch of the third R-7 rocket (8K71 No.7) took place on 12 July. An electrical short caused the vernier engines to put the missile into an uncontrolled roll which resulted in all of the strap-ons separating 33 seconds into the launch.

The launch of the fourth rocket (8K71 No.8), on 21 August at 15:25 Moscow Time, was successful. The rocket's core boosted the dummy warhead to the target altitude and velocity, reentered the atmosphere, and broke apart at a height of  after traveling . On 27 August, the TASS issued a statement on the successful launch of a long-distance multistage ICBM. The launch of the fifth R-7 rocket (8K71 No.9), on 7 September, was also successful, but the dummy was also destroyed on atmospheric re-entry, and hence needed a redesign to completely fulfill its military purpose. The rocket, however, was deemed suitable for satellite launches, and Korolev was able to convince the State Commission to allow the use of the next R-7 to launch PS-1, allowing the delay in the rocket's military exploitation to launch the PS-1 and PS-2 satellites.

On 22 September a modified R-7 rocket, named Sputnik and indexed as 8K71PS, arrived at the proving ground and preparations for the launch of PS-1 began.

Observation complex 
PS-1 was not designed to be controlled; it could only be observed. Initial data at the launch site would be collected at six separate observatories and telegraphed to NII-4. Located back in Moscow (at Bolshevo), NII-4 was a scientific research arm of the Ministry of Defence that was dedicated to missile development.

A second, nationwide observation complex was established to track the satellite after its separation from the rocket. Called the Command-Measurement Complex, it consisted of the coordination center in NII-4 and seven distant stations situated along the line of the satellite's ground track. These tracking stations were located at Tyuratam, Sary-Shagan, Yeniseysk, Klyuchi, Yelizovo, Makat in Guryev Oblast, and Ishkup in Krasnoyarsk Krai. Stations were equipped with radar, optical instruments, and communications systems. Data from stations were transmitted by telegraphs into NII-4 where ballistics specialists calculated orbital parameters.

The observatories used a trajectory measurement system called "Tral", developed by OKB MEI (Moscow Energy Institute), by which they received and monitored data from transponders mounted on the R-7 rocket's core stage. The data was useful even after the satellite's separation from the second stage of the rocket; Sputnik's location was calculated from the data on the second stage's location which followed Sputnik at a known distance. Tracking of the booster during launch had to be accomplished through purely passive means such as visual coverage and radar detection.

Outside the Soviet Union, the satellite was tracked by amateur radio operators in many countries. The booster rocket was located and tracked by the British using the Lovell Telescope at the Jodrell Bank Observatory, the only telescope in the world able to do so by radar. Canada's Newbrook Observatory was the first facility in North America to photograph Sputnik 1.

Design 

The chief constructor of Sputnik 1 at OKB-1 was Mikhail S. Khomyakov. The satellite was a  diameter sphere, assembled from two hemispheres that were hermetically sealed with O-rings and connected by 36 bolts. The hemispheres were 2 mm thick, and were covered with a highly polished 1 mm-thick heat shield made of an aluminium–magnesium–titanium alloy, AMG6T. The satellite carried two pairs of antennas designed by the Antenna Laboratory of OKB-1, led by Mikhail V. Krayushkin. Each antenna was made up of two whip-like parts,  in length, and had an almost spherical radiation pattern.

It consisted of three silver-zinc batteries, developed at the All-Union Research Institute of Power Sources (VNIIT) under the leadership of Nikolai S. Lidorenko. Two of these batteries powered the radio transmitter and one powered the temperature regulation system. The batteries had an expected lifetime of two weeks, and operated for 22 days. The power supply was turned on automatically at the moment of the satellite's separation from the second stage of the rocket.

The satellite had a one-watt,  radio transmitting unit inside, developed by Vyacheslav I. Lappo from NII-885, the Moscow Electronics Research Institute, that worked on two frequencies, 20.005 and 40.002 MHz. Signals on the first frequency were transmitted in 0.3 s pulses (near f = 3 Hz) (under normal temperature and pressure conditions on board), with pauses of the same duration filled by pulses on the second frequency. Analysis of the radio signals was used to gather information about the electron density of the ionosphere. Temperature and pressure were encoded in the duration of radio beeps. A temperature regulation system contained a fan, a dual thermal switch, and a control thermal switch. If the temperature inside the satellite exceeded , the fan was turned on; when it fell below , the fan was turned off by the dual thermal switch. If the temperature exceeded  or fell below , another control thermal switch was activated, changing the duration of the radio signal pulses. The satellite had a barometric switch, activated if the pressure inside the satellite fell below 130 kPa, which would have indicated failure of the pressure vessel or puncture by a meteor, and would have changed the duration of radio signal impulse.

The fairing separated from both Sputnik and the spent R-7 second stage at the same time as the satellite was ejected. Tests of the satellite were conducted at OKB-1 under the leadership of Oleg G. Ivanovsky.

Launch and mission 

The trajectory had been calculated earlier by Georgi Grechko, using the USSR Academy of Sciences' mainframe computer.

The Sputnik rocket was launched on 4 October 1957 at 19:28:34 UTC (5 October at the launch site) from Site No.1 at NIIP-5. Telemetry indicated that the strap-ons separated 116 seconds into the flight and the core stage engine shut down 295.4 seconds into the flight.

A fuel regulator in the booster also failed around 16 seconds into launch, which resulted in excessive RP-1 consumption for most of the powered flight and the engine thrust being 4% above nominal. Core stage cutoff was intended for T+296 seconds, but the premature propellant depletion caused thrust termination to occur one second earlier when a sensor detected overspeed of the empty RP-1 turbopump.

At 19.9 seconds after engine cut-off, PS-1 separated from the second stage and the satellite's transmitter was activated. These signals were detected at the IP-1 station by Junior Engineer-Lieutenant V.G. Borisov, where reception of Sputnik 1's "beep-beep-beep" tones confirmed the satellite's successful deployment. Reception lasted for 2 minutes, until PS-1 fell below the horizon. The Tral telemetry system on the R-7 core stage continued to transmit and was detected on its second orbit.

The designers, engineers and technicians who developed the rocket and satellite watched the launch from the range. After the launch they drove to the mobile radio station to listen for signals from the satellite. They waited about 90 minutes to ensure that the satellite had made one orbit and was transmitting before Korolev called Soviet premier Nikita Khrushchev.

On the first orbit the Telegraph Agency of the Soviet Union (TASS) transmitted: "As result of great, intense work of scientific institutes and design bureaus the first artificial Earth satellite has been built". The R-7 core stage, with a mass of 7.5 tonnes and a length of 26 metres, also reached Earth orbit. It was a first magnitude object following behind the satellite and visible at night. Deployable reflective panels were placed on the booster in order to increase its visibility for tracking. A small highly polished sphere, the satellite was barely visible at sixth magnitude, and thus harder to follow optically. The batteries ran out on 26 October 1957, after the satellite completed 326 orbits.

The core stage of the R-7 remained in orbit for two months until 2 December 1957, while Sputnik 1 orbited for three months, until 4 January 1958, having completed 1,440 orbits of the Earth.

Reception 

The Soviets provided details of Sputnik 1 before the launch, but few outside the Soviet Union noticed. After reviewing information publicly available before the launch, the science writer Willy Ley wrote in 1958:  Organized through the citizen science project Operation Moonwatch, teams of visual observers at 150 stations in the United States and other countries were alerted during the night to watch for the satellite at dawn and during the evening twilight as it passed overhead. The USSR requested amateur and professional radio operators to tape record the signal being transmitted from the satellite.

News reports at the time pointed out that "anyone possessing a short wave receiver can hear the new Russian earth satellite as it hurtles over this area of the globe." Directions, provided by the American Radio Relay League, were to "Tune in 20 megacycles sharply, by the time signals, given on that frequency. Then tune to slightly higher frequencies. The 'beep, beep' sound of the satellite can be heard each time it rounds the globe." The first recording of Sputnik 1's signal was made by RCA engineers near Riverhead, Long Island. They then drove the tape recording into Manhattan for broadcast to the public over NBC radio. However, as Sputnik rose higher over the East Coast, its signal was picked up by W2AEE, the ham radio station of Columbia University. Students working in the university's FM station, WKCR, made a tape of this, and were the first to rebroadcast the Sputnik signal to the American public (or whoever could receive the FM station).

The Soviet Union agreed to transmit on frequencies that worked with the United States' existing infrastructure, but later announced the lower frequencies. Asserting that the launch "did not come as a surprise", the White House refused to comment on any military aspects. On 5 October the Naval Research Laboratory captured recordings of Sputnik 1 during four crossings over the United States. The USAF Cambridge Research Center collaborated with Bendix-Friez, Westinghouse Broadcasting, and the Smithsonian Astrophysical Observatory to obtain a video of Sputnik's rocket body crossing the pre-dawn sky of Baltimore, broadcast on 12 October by WBZ-TV in Boston.

The success of Sputnik 1 seemed to have changed minds around the world regarding a shift in power to the Soviets.

The USSR's launch of Sputnik 1 spurred the United States to create the Advanced Research Projects Agency (ARPA, later DARPA) in February 1958 to regain a technological lead.

In Britain, the media and population initially reacted with a mixture of fear for the future, but also amazement about human progress. Many newspapers and magazines heralded the arrival of the Space Age. However, when the USSR launched Sputnik 2, containing the dog Laika, the media narrative returned to one of anti-Communism and many people sent protests to the Soviet embassy and the RSPCA.

Propaganda 

Sputnik 1 was not immediately used for Soviet propaganda. The Soviets had kept quiet about their earlier accomplishments in rocketry, fearing that it would lead to secrets being revealed and failures being exploited by the West. When the Soviets began using Sputnik in their propaganda, they emphasized pride in the achievement of Soviet technology, arguing that it demonstrated the Soviets' superiority over the West. People were encouraged to listen to Sputnik's signals on the radio and to look out for Sputnik in the night sky. While Sputnik itself had been highly polished, its small size made it barely visible to the naked eye. What most watchers actually saw was the much more visible 26-metre core stage of the R-7. Shortly after the launch of PS-1, Khrushchev pressed Korolev to launch another satellite to coincide with the 40th anniversary of the October Revolution, on 7 November 1957.

The launch of Sputnik 1 surprised the American public, and shattered the perception created by American propaganda of the United States as the technological superpower, and the Soviet Union as a backward country. Privately, however, the CIA and President Eisenhower were aware of progress being made by the Soviets on Sputnik from secret spy plane imagery. Together with the Jet Propulsion Laboratory (JPL), the Army Ballistic Missile Agency built Explorer 1, and launched it on 31 January 1958. Before work was completed, however, the Soviet Union launched a second satellite, Sputnik 2, on 3 November 1957. Meanwhile, the televised failure of Vanguard TV-3 on 6 December 1957 deepened American dismay over the country's position in the Space Race. The Americans took a more aggressive stance in the emerging space race, resulting in an emphasis on science and technological research, and reforms in many areas from the military to education systems. The federal government began investing in science, engineering, and mathematics at all levels of education. An advanced research group was assembled for military purposes. These research groups developed weapons such as ICBMs and missile defense systems, as well as spy satellites for the U.S.

Legacy 

Initially, U.S. President Eisenhower was not surprised by Sputnik 1. He had been forewarned of the R-7's capabilities by information derived from U-2 spy plane overflight photos, as well as signals and telemetry intercepts. The Eisenhower administration's first response was low-key and almost dismissive. Eisenhower was even pleased that the USSR, not the U.S., would be the first to test the waters of the still-uncertain legal status of orbital satellite overflights. Eisenhower had suffered the Soviet protests and shoot-downs of Project Genetrix (Moby Dick) balloons and was concerned about the probability of a U-2 being shot down. To set a precedent for "freedom of space" before the launch of America's secret WS-117L spy satellites, the U.S. had launched Project Vanguard as its own "civilian" satellite entry for the International Geophysical Year. Eisenhower greatly underestimated the reaction of the American public, who were shocked by the launch of Sputnik and by the televised failure of the Vanguard Test Vehicle 3 launch attempt. The sense of anxiety was inflamed by Democratic politicians and professional cold warriors, who portrayed the United States as woefully behind. One of the many books that suddenly appeared for the lay-audience noted seven points of "impact" upon the nation: Western leadership, Western strategy and tactics, missile production, applied research, basic research, education, and democratic culture. As public and the government became interested in space and related science and technology, the phenomenon was sometimes dubbed the "Sputnik craze".

The U.S. soon had a number of successful satellites, including Explorer 1, Project SCORE, and Courier 1B. However, public reaction to the Sputnik crisis spurred America to action in the Space Race, leading to the creation of both the Advanced Research Projects Agency (renamed the Defense Advanced Research Projects Agency, or DARPA, in 1972), and NASA (through the National Aeronautics and Space Act), as well as increased U.S. government spending on scientific research and education through the National Defense Education Act.

Sputnik also contributed directly to a new emphasis on science and technology in American schools. With a sense of urgency, Congress enacted the 1958 National Defense Education Act, which provided low-interest loans for college tuition to students majoring in mathematics and science. After the launch of Sputnik, a poll conducted and published by the University of Michigan showed that 26% of Americans surveyed thought that Russian sciences and engineering were superior to that of the United States. (A year later, however, that figure had dropped to 10% as the U.S. began launching its own satellites into space.)

One consequence of the Sputnik shock was the perception of a "missile gap". This became a dominant issue in the 1960 Presidential campaign.

One irony of the Sputnik event was the initially low-key response of the Soviet Union. The Communist Party newspaper Pravda only printed a few paragraphs about Sputnik 1 on 4 October.

Sputnik also inspired a generation of engineers and scientists. Harrison Storms, the North American designer who was responsible for the X-15 rocket plane, and went on to head the effort to design the Apollo command and service module and Saturn V launch vehicle's second stage, was moved by the launch of Sputnik to think of space as being the next step for America. Astronauts Alan Shepard (who was the first American in space) and Deke Slayton later wrote of how the sight of Sputnik 1 passing overhead inspired them to their new careers.

The launch of Sputnik 1 led to the resurgence of the suffix -nik in the English language. The American writer Herb Caen was inspired to coin the term "beatnik" in an article about the Beat Generation in the San Francisco Chronicle on 2 April 1958.

The flag of the Russian city of Kaluga, (which, due to it being Konstantin Tsiolkovsky's birthplace, is very dedicated to space and space travel) features a small Sputnik in the canton.

Satellite navigation 

The launch of Sputnik also planted the seeds for the development of modern satellite navigation. Two American physicists, William Guier and George Weiffenbach, at Johns Hopkins University's Applied Physics Laboratory (APL) decided to monitor Sputnik's radio transmissions and within hours realized that, because of the Doppler effect, they could pinpoint where the satellite was along its orbit. The Director of the APL gave them access to their UNIVAC computer to do the then heavy calculations required.

Early the next year, Frank McClure, the deputy director of the APL, asked Guier and Weiffenbach to investigate the inverse problem: pinpointing the user's location, given the satellite's. At the time, the Navy was developing the submarine-launched Polaris missile, which required them to know the submarine's location. This led them and APL to develop the TRANSIT system, a forerunner of modern Global Positioning System (GPS) satellites.

Backup units and replicas 

At least two vintage duplicates of Sputnik 1 exist, built apparently as backup units. One resides just outside Moscow in the corporate museum of Energia, the modern descendant of Korolev's design bureau, where it is on display by appointment only. Another is in the Museum of Flight in Seattle, Washington. Unlike Energia's unit, it has no internal components, but it does have casings and molded fittings inside (as well as evidence of battery wear), which suggests it was built as more than just a model. Authenticated by the Memorial Museum of Cosmonautics in Moscow, the unit was auctioned in 2001 and purchased by an anonymous private buyer, who donated it to the museum. Two more Sputnik backups are said to be in the personal collections of American entrepreneurs Richard Garriott and Jay S. Walker.

In 1959, the Soviet Union donated a replica of Sputnik to the United Nations. There are other full-size Sputnik replicas (with varying degrees of accuracy) on display in locations around the world, including the National Air and Space Museum in the United States, the Science Museum in the United Kingdom, the Powerhouse Museum in Australia, and outside the Russian embassy in Spain.

Three one-third scale student-built replicas of Sputnik 1 were deployed from the Mir space station between 1997 and 1999. The first, named Sputnik 40 to commemorate the fortieth anniversary of the launch of Sputnik 1, was deployed in November 1997. Sputnik 41 was launched a year later, and Sputnik 99 was deployed in February 1999. A fourth replica was launched, but never deployed, and was destroyed when Mir was deorbited.

The Sputnik 1 EMC/EMI is a class of full-scale laboratory models of the satellite. The models, manufactured by OKB-1 and NII-885 (headed by Mikhail Ryazansky), were introduced on February 15, 1957. They were made to test ground electromagnetic compatibility (EMC) and electromagnetic interference (EMI).

See also 

 Yuri Gagarin — Soviet cosmonaut and first human to journey into outer space
 Donald B. Gillies — one of the first to calculate the Sputnik 1 orbit
 Kerim Kerimov — one of the lead architects behind Sputnik 1
 Valentina Tereshkova — first woman in space
 ILLIAC I — first computer to calculate the orbit of Sputnik 1
 Timeline of artificial satellites and space probes
 Timeline of Russian innovation

References

Bibliography

Further reading

External links 

Satellite One: The story of the first man-made device in space by Russian News Agency TASS
Documents related to Sputnik 1 and the Space Race at the Dwight D. Eisenhower Presidential Library
50th Anniversary of the Space Age & Sputnik – an interactive media by NASA
 Remembering Sputnik: Sir Arthur C. Clarke – an interview for IEEE Spectrum
Sputnik Program Page by NASA's Solar System Exploration
 NASA on Sputnik 1
 A joint Russian project of Ground microprocessing information systems SRC "PLANETA" and Space Monitoring Information Support laboratory (IKI RAN) dedicated to the 40th anniversary of Sputnik 1
 

1
Spacecraft launched in 1957
1957 in the Soviet Union
Amateur radio history
Spacecraft which reentered in 1958
Soviet inventions
Satellites of the Soviet Union
Nikita Khrushchev
1957 in international relations
History of electronic engineering
First artificial satellites of a country
Cold War terminology
1958 in the Soviet Union
Articles containing video clips
Technology demonstration satellites
Geospace monitoring satellites